Raúl Abatte Osario (born 10 September 1945) is a Chilean shooter. He competed in the mixed trap event at the 1984 Summer Olympics.

References

1945 births
Living people
Shooters at the 1984 Summer Olympics
Chilean male sport shooters
Olympic shooters of Chile
20th-century Chilean people